The 1900–01 Scottish Division One season was won by Rangers by six points over nearest rival Celtic.

League table

Results

References 

1900–01 Scottish Football League
Scottish Division One seasons
Scottish